Lee Jeong-hui (born 10 August 1965) is a South Korean gymnast. She competed in six events at the 1984 Summer Olympics.

References

1965 births
Living people
South Korean female artistic gymnasts
Olympic gymnasts of South Korea
Gymnasts at the 1984 Summer Olympics
Place of birth missing (living people)
Asian Games medalists in gymnastics
Gymnasts at the 1982 Asian Games
Asian Games bronze medalists for South Korea
Medalists at the 1982 Asian Games
20th-century South Korean women